Carex assiniboinensis, commonly known as the assiniboia sedge, is a species of sedge (Carex) in the section Hymenochlaenae. First described scientifically in 1884 by American botanist William Boott, it is found in Canada and the United States, where it grows in floodplain forests, old river channels, riparian woodlands, and shrub thickets.

Description

References

assiniboinensis
Flora of Manitoba
Flora of Saskatchewan
Flora of Ontario
Flora of the North-Central United States
Flora of Michigan
Plants described in 1884
Flora without expected TNC conservation status